City Conquest was a cancelled South Korean television series.

Starring Kim Hyun-joong, Jeong Yu-mi and Namkoong Min, it began filming in Japan in July 2012. Due to Kim's Korean Wave fanbase, international broadcasting rights were pre-sold to Japan, China, Hong Kong and Taiwan.

But in February 2013, prospective broadcaster KBS denied it a slot in their 2013 drama lineup, because network officials found the series "too violent" and its quality not up to their standards. Unable to secure a slot with the other two major channels in Korea, MBC and SBS, filming was halted and the project cancelled.

Japanese satellite/digital terrestrial channel DATV was one of the show's investors, and in July 2013, it aired the one-hour TV special City Conquest: Episode Zero, showing existing footage shot on location in Nikko, Utsunomiya and Kinugawa, as well as behind-the-scenes clips. The special was uploaded on YouTube and was also released on a Japan-only Blu-ray/DVD.

Plot
A young man named Baek Mi-reu blames his father for abandoning him and his mother, which sets him on the path of revenge upon the evils of society.

Cast
Kim Hyun-joong - Baek Miru
Jeong Yu-mi - Lee Dan-bi
Namkoong Min - Cha Ji-ryong
Kim Seung-woo - Baek Seung-hyun, Mi-reu's father
Park Hyo-jun - Park Gwang-ya
Kim Hee-won - Choi Yeong-soo
Kim Young-ho - Cha Seong-gwang
Choi Cheol-ho

Production
City Conquest was supposed to be the second project of Baek Jin-dong's "Media 100" production company, after the 2012 TV Chosun drama Ji Woon-soo's Stroke of Luck.

References

External links
 

Korean-language television shows
Television shows based on comics
South Korean drama television series